TIF or Tagged Image File Format is a file format for storing images.

TIF may also refer to:

 Ta’if Regional Airport, IATA code TIF, in Ta'if, Saudi Arabia
 Tax increment financing, a public financing method 
 Tokyo Idol Festival, a Japanese female idol music festival
 Transport Innovation Fund, an English transport funding mechanism
 Türkiye İzcilik Federasyonu, the Scouting and Guiding Federation of Turkey
 Thessaloniki International Fair, a trade fair in Thessaloniki, Greece
 Thallium(I) fluoride, a chemical formula "TIF2"
 Transoral incisionless fundoplication, a medical treatment for gastroesophageal reflux disease (GERD)

See also
 TIFF (disambiguation)
 TIFFE (disambiguation)